Futurepoem Books is an American not-for-profit press based in New York City. Futurepoem was founded by Dan Machlin in 2002 and focuses on publishing innovative poetry, prose and hybrid literature. The press has a rotating editorial board.

Three books are published each year: two from the open reading period and one winner of the Other Futures Award. Each year three new editors select books sent in during the presses open reading period. Winners of the Other Futures Award receive publication with a standard royalty contract, an honorarium of $1000, and 25 author copies.

Futurepoem has received funding from The New York State Council on the Arts Literature Program and National Endowment for the Arts Literature program.

Personnel
 Dan Machlin, Founding Editor
 Monica de la Torre, Senior Editor of BOMB Magazine
 Jeremy Sigler, Associate Editor

Publications

2011-2020

2002-2010

See also
 Ugly Duckling Presse

References

External links
 Futurepoem Books official site

Book publishing companies based in New York (state)
Publishing companies established in 2002
2002 establishments in New York City